The Tyler County Courthouse in Woodville, Texas was built in 1891.

It was a red brick building in Italianate style when built.  A 1936 renovation added stucco.  Tallish, narrow windows topped by arches are among remnants of Italianate style.

It was the third courthouse built on the courthouse square.

The building received emergency electrical rewiring work in 2004.

See also

National Register of Historic Places listings in Tyler County, Texas
Recorded Texas Historic Landmarks in Tyler County

References

External links

Courthouses in Texas
National Register of Historic Places in Tyler County, Texas
Italianate architecture in Texas
Government buildings completed in 1891